Lecithocera bimaculata is a moth in the family Lecithoceridae first described by Kyu-Tek Park in 1999. It is found in Taiwan.

The wingspan is 20–21 mm. The forewings are yellowish orange, slightly speckled with dark-brown scales. They are broader towards the termen. There are two discal spots, a small one in the middle and larger one at end of the cell and inconspicuously connected with the pretornal patch. The hindwings are pale yellowish white.

Etymology
The species name is derived from the Latin bi (meaning two) and maculata (meaning spot) and refers to the two distinct discal spots.

References

Moths described in 1999
bimaculata